Doña Francisca Lacsamana de Ortega Memorial National High School, commonly known as FLOS, is a public secondary school in Bangar, La Union, Philippines.

History
Bangar Municipal High School opened in 1972, on the initiative of former Mayor Avelino Pascua. It started with two classrooms for first and second year levels, at the old Gabaldon Campus. The school was later renamed as Doña Francisca Lacsamana de Ortega Memorial National High School. The CaSaCristo Annex was added in 1983. In 1994, the school became the Mother Institution of the Regional Science High School for Region 1, after it was recognized by the Department of Education, Culture and Sports as one of the "most effective secondary schools in the Philippines".

Educational programs
The school's main campus has special programs for students with high aptitude in science, sports, or arts.

References

High schools in the Philippines
Schools in La Union
1972 establishments in the Philippines
Educational institutions established in 1972